Divion is a commune and in the Pas-de-Calais department in the Hauts-de-France region of France.

Geography
Since the mid-1960s, work in farming and light industry have replaced coal mining.

Population

Places of interest
 The church of St.Martin, rebuilt, as was much of the town, after World War I.
 The  Commonwealth War Graves Commission cemetery.
 A fifteenth century sandstone cross.
 Remains of an old castle.

See also
Communes of the Pas-de-Calais department

References

External links

 The CWGC graveyard in the communal cemetery

Communes of Pas-de-Calais